The Des Moines Marriott Hotel is a high-rise hotel located in Downtown Des Moines, Iowa, United States. It is currently the 3rd-tallest building in the city and the tallest hotel in Iowa. The structure was completed in 1981 and contains 417 guest rooms. The property had been previously occupied by the Royal Union Life Building.

See also
 List of tallest buildings in Iowa

References

Hotel buildings completed in 1981
Skyscraper hotels in Iowa
Skyscrapers in Des Moines, Iowa
Modernist architecture in Iowa
Marriott hotels
1981 establishments in Iowa